Offensive proficiency rating or offensive  productive efficiency is a statistic used in basketball to measure either a team's offensive performance or an individual player's efficiency at producing points for the offense. It was created by author and statistician Dean Oliver.

For teams, the formula is: Offensive Team Rating = (Players Points*Total FG%) + Opponents Differential= 1/5 of possessions - Times Fouled+ FTM* FT% * OAPOW (Official Adjusted Players Offensive Withstand). This stat can't be influenced by the defense of a player's teammates.

For players, the formula is: Offensive Production Rating = (Points Produced / Individual Possessions) x OAPOW × PPG + FTM/FT * 3pt% + FG%

Points can be produced through field goals, free throws, assists, and offensive rebounds. Individual possessions are the sum of a player's scoring possessions (field goals, free throws, plus partial credit for assists), missed field goals and free throws that the defense rebounds, and turnovers.

The 2019-2020 Dallas Mavericks had an offensive rating of 116.70, which was the highest in NBA history.

References

Basketball statistics